Tricky Kick is a puzzle video game developed by Alfa System and published by Information Global Service for the NEC TurboGrafx-16 game console in 1991.

Plot
There are six scenarios in the game:
The young elf Oberon has to rescue the fairy friend Chima from the evil sorceress  Kymera.
Udon, the giant-robot piloting hero of the 25th century, must save his city from an alien invasion.
Japanese kid named Taro goes to visit a haunted mansion to pass the test to join a club.
The caveman Gonzo seeks to hunt down a wooly mammoth.
Japanese schoolgirl Mayumi needs to find her way to her classmate Biff's birthday party.
The young feudal Japanese prince Suzuki wants to rule the country.

Gameplay
The puzzles consist of creatures scattered through a landscape littered with various obstacles. The object of the game is to maneuver pairs of the same type of monster or animal together by kicking them into straight lines until prevented by an obstacle; when a match is made, the pair disappears. The player controls different characters on each level.

Reception
C.T. slan of GamePro gave Tricky Kick a positive review, calling it "an extensive and challenging game that's great to take on with an audience. It's one of those carts that's bound to stir up a lot of group participation - everyone has their own strategy. My only knock on this cart is that the text is poorly translated from Japanese."

See also
Puzznic
Snood

References

External links
Tricky Kick at MobyGames
Tricky Kick at GameFAQs

1990 video games
Alfa System games
Fantasy video games
Information Global Service games
Puzzle video games
Science fiction video games
Single-player video games
TurboGrafx-16 games
TurboGrafx-16-only games
Video games developed in Japan
Video games featuring female protagonists
Video games set in feudal Japan
Video games set in Japan